The following is a list of musicians who have performed in the American R&B, soul, and funk band Earth, Wind & Fire.

Members

Current

Former

Phenix Horns (1975–1983) / Earth, Wind & Fire Horns (1987–present)

Current

Former

Timeline

Line-ups 
The following is a complete chronology of the various line-ups of Earth, Wind & Fire, from the group's inception in 1971 until the present day.

References 

Earth, Wind and Fire